The 1980 St. Louis Cardinals season was the 61st season the team was in the league. The team matched their previous output of 5–11. The team failed to reach the playoffs for the fifth consecutive season.

Offseason

NFL Draft

Personnel

Staff

Roster

Schedule

Standings

References

1980
St. Louis Cardinals